The 1939–40 NHL season was the 23rd season for the National Hockey League. Of the league's seven teams, the Boston Bruins were the best in the 48-game regular season, but the Stanley Cup winners were the New York Rangers, who defeated the Toronto Maple Leafs in the best-of-seven final series 4–2 for their third Stanley Cup in 14 seasons of existence.  It would be another 54 years before their fourth.

League business
In June 1939, the Canadian Amateur Hockey Association notified the NHL of the request for development fees when signing amateur players to contracts, after the existing professional-amateur deal expired in 1940.

Regular season
Tragedy struck the Montreal Canadiens when Babe Siebert, named coach of the struggling club, drowned along with his daughter in August. It put a big hole in the Habs defence and the team finished last under Pit Lepine. An all-star benefit was held in Siebert's memory.

The New York Americans, in financial trouble, decided to trade their star left wing 
Sweeney Schriner to Toronto for Harvey "Busher" Jackson, Buzz Boll, Murray Armstrong, and minor-leaguer Jimmy Fowler. Late in the season, they traded Eddie Wiseman and $5000 to Boston for Eddie Shore. The Americans then managed to make the playoffs by finishing a poor sixth. They also obtained Charlie Conacher and used him as a defenceman.

The first place Boston Bruins had a new coach in Cooney Weiland, their one-time captain, and were once again led by their Kraut Line, Milt Schmidt, Woody Dumart, and Bobby Bauer as they finished 1–2–3 in overall league scoring. Unfortunately, the potent three were unable to help the Bruins get past the first round of the playoffs as the Bruins lost in six games to the Rangers.

The New York Rangers were coasting in first place and went 19 consecutive games without a loss.
They slumped in the second half, though, and Boston edged them out for first place.

The first NHL game broadcast on television was between the New York Rangers and Montreal Canadiens on February 25, 1940. The game was seen by only 300 people in a small area in the United States. This, though, was not the first ice hockey game broadcast on television, as a broadcast had been made in England in 1938. The CBC's first hockey broadcast was in 1952 between the Montreal Canadiens and Detroit Red Wings.

Final standings

Playoffs
The Boston Bruins were expected to make the Stanley Cup Finals after a first overall finish during the regular season riding the shoulders of the "Kraut Line". But the New York Rangers were too much for the Bruins who lost in six games, out-scored 14 to 8 and shut-out twice, in the Semifinals. The third seed Toronto Maple Leafs swept the Detroit Red Wings and Chicago Black Hawks en route to the Stanley Cup Finals. The Rangers Cup win would begin the 54 Year Curse, and they would not win another Cup until 1994.

Playoff bracket

Quarterfinals

(3) Toronto Maple Leafs vs. (4) Chicago Black Hawks

(5) Detroit Red Wings vs. (6) New York Americans

Semifinals

(1) Boston Bruins vs. (2) New York Rangers

(3) Toronto Maple Leafs vs. (5) Detroit Red Wings

Stanley Cup Finals

Awards

All-Star teams

Player statistics
Regular season

Scoring leaders
Note: GP = Games played; G = Goals; A = Assists; Pts = Points

Source: NHL

Leading goaltenders

Note: GP = Games played; Min = Minutes played; GA = Goals against; GAA = Goals against average; W = Wins; L = Losses; T = Ties; SO = Shutouts

Playoffs

Playoff scoring leaders
Note: GP = Games played; G = Goals; A = Assists; Pts = Points; PIM = Penalty minutes

Playoff leading goaltenders
Note: GP = Games played; Min = Minutes played; GAA = Goals against average; W = Wins; L = Losses; T = Ties; SO = Shutouts

Coaches
Boston Bruins: Cooney Weiland
Chicago Black Hawks: Paul Thompson
Detroit Red Wings: Jack Adams
Montreal Canadiens: Babe Siebert and Alfred Lepine
New York Americans: Red Dutton
New York Rangers: Frank Boucher
Toronto Maple Leafs: Dick Irvin

Debuts
The following is a list of players of note who played their first NHL game in 1939–40 (listed with their first team, asterisk(*) marks debut in playoffs):
Doug Bentley, Chicago Black Hawks
Johnny Mowers, Detroit Red Wings
Pat Egan, New York Americans
Kilby MacDonald, New York Rangers

Last games
The following is a list of players of note that played their last game in the NHL in 1939–40 (listed with their last team):
Tiny Thompson, Detroit Red Wings
Cecil Dillon, Detroit Red Wings
Hec Kilrea, Detroit Red Wings
Cy Wentworth, Montreal Canadiens
Earl Robinson, Montreal Canadiens
Armand Mondou, Montreal Canadiens
Marty Barry, Montreal Canadiens
Doc Romnes, New York Americans
Art Chapman, New York Americans
Nels Stewart, New York Americans
Eddie Shore, New York Americans
Cliff Barton, New York Rangers, last active player form the Pittsburgh Pirates (NHL) franchise.  
Johnny Gagnon, New York Rangers
Red Horner, Toronto Maple Leafs

See also
1939-40 NHL transactions
List of Stanley Cup champions
1939 in sports
1940 in sports

References
 
 
 
 
 

Notes

External links

Hockey Database
1939–40 NHL Playoff Season Stats – quanthockey.com
1939–40 NHL Playoff Season Goaltender Stats
NHL.com

 
1939–40 in Canadian ice hockey by league
1939–40 in American ice hockey by league